Paul Davis McNulty (August 9, 1902 – September 27, 1985) was a professional American football player who played wide receiver for two seasons for the Chicago Cardinals.

References

1902 births
1985 deaths
American football ends
Chicago Cardinals players
Michigan Wolverines football players
Notre Dame Fighting Irish football players
Players of American football from Chicago